Matoš is a Croatian surname. Notable people with the surname include:

 Antun Gustav Matoš (1873–1914), Croatian writer
 Marin Matoš (born 1989), Croatian football player 

Croatian surnames